The Spell of the Circus (1931) is a Universal 10-chapter movie serial. Francis X. Bushman Jr. played the trick horseback rider/hero Jack Grant. This is considered to be a lost film.

Plot
Butte Morgan (villain) plans to take over a circus by marrying Maria Wallace, the daughter of the circus's owner. She, however, is interested only in the trick rider Jack Grant..

Cast
Francis X. Bushman Jr. (aka Ralph Bushman) as Jack Grant, the circus' cowboy rider
Alberta Vaughn as Maria Wallace, daughter of George Wallace & in love with Jack Grant
Tom London as Butte Morgan, intends to take over the circus by marrying Maria
Walter Shumway as George Wallace, the owner of the circus
Charles Murphy as Hank Harris
Monte Montague as Totto 
Bobby Nelson as Bobby

Chapter titles
 A Menacing Monster
 The Phantom Shadow
 Racing with Death
 A Scream of Terror
 A Leap for Life
 A Fatal Wedding
 A Villain Unmasked
 The Baited Trap
 The Terror Tent
 The Call of the Circus
Source:

See also
 List of film serials
 List of film serials by studio

References

External links
 
 

1931 films
1930s action adventure films
American black-and-white films
1930s English-language films
Lost American films
Universal Pictures film serials
Films directed by Robert F. Hill
Circus films
American action adventure films
1931 lost films
Lost action adventure films
1930s American films